David Lee "Deacon" Turner (January 2, 1955 – July 10, 2011) was a professional American football running back in the National Football League. He attended San Diego State University. He played with the Cincinnati Bengals from 1978 to 1980.

On July 10, 2011, Turner was fatally shot during an altercation with Kern County Sheriff deputies in Bakersfield, California in which he allegedly swung a bag of unopened beer at a deputy. Witnesses at the scene alleged that one deputy struck him from behind with a baton as he attempted to walk away. His son, with him at the time, says that deputies fired when Turner fell and the beer can that he was carrying exploded after hitting the ground.  He was 56 years old.

References

External links
Pro-Football reference
Death information
CBS News on Turner's death

1955 births
2011 deaths 
American football running backs
Cincinnati Bengals players
Players of American football from Bakersfield, California
Players of American football from Jackson, Mississippi
Deaths by firearm in California
African Americans shot dead by law enforcement officers in the United States
San Diego State Aztecs football players